The 2000 Rugby League World Cup qualification play-off was a rugby league match that was played on 21 November 1999 at Disney's Wide World of Sports Complex in the United States. Lebanon defeated the United States 62–8 to qualify for the 2000 Rugby League World Cup.

Match details

References

2000 Rugby League World Cup
1999 in rugby league
1999 in sports in Florida
Rugby league in the United States
Rugby league in Florida